Erling Øverland (born 31 May 1952) is a Norwegian businessperson.

After graduating with a siv.øk. degree from the Norwegian School of Economics (NHH) in 1976, Øverland joined Statoil as a financial and planning coordinator. He served as chief financial officer from 1995 to 2000, executive vice president for manufacturing and marketing from 2000 to 2004, and as acting chief executive from March to August 2004. In 2004 he became president of the Confederation of Norwegian Enterprise (NHO). In 2008 he was succeeded by Paul-Christian Rieber. He has also been a board chairman of PCI Biotech and board member of Norges Varemesse and SR-bank. In early 2009 he became acting CFO of SR-Bank.

References

1952 births
Living people
Norwegian School of Economics alumni
Norwegian businesspeople in the oil industry
Equinor people
Chief financial officers